The UCI Under 23 Nations' Cup is an annual, season-long competition for under-23 male road cyclists. It was created by the Union Cycliste Internationale in 2007 to aid in the development of young riders. It is the most important competition for under-23 riders.

Races

Current
The following races are part of the 2022 edition of the Nations Cup:
 Tour de l'Avenir
 Orlen Nations Grand Prix
 Ghent–Wevelgem U23
 Course de la Paix-Grand Prix Jeseníky
 World Under-23 Championships
 European and Pan American continental championships

Former
 Ronde Van Vlaanderen U23
 Liège–Bastogne–Liège Espoirs
 La Côte Picarde
 Giro delle Regioni
 ZLM Roompot Tour
 Trofeo Almar
 Étoile d'Or
 Coupe des nations Ville Saguenay
 Toscana-Terra di Ciclismo
 Grand Prix Guillaume Tell
 Tour de l'Espoir
 Grand Prix du Portugal
 Oceanian, African and Asian continental cycling championships

References

External links 

 

Nations Cup
Men's road cycling
Recurring sporting events established in 2007